Bethel is an unincorporated community in Highland County, Virginia, United States. The community is situated between two mountain ridges in the Big Valley near Bolar Run on Virginia State Route 607.

References

Unincorporated communities in Highland County, Virginia
Unincorporated communities in Virginia